Babelomurex miyokoae is a species of sea snail, a marine gastropod mollusk, in the family Muricidae, the murex snails or rock snails. It is distributed near the Philippines and Japan.

References

miyokoae
Gastropods described in 1985